Floribert of Liège (died 746) was a bishop of Liège, and a saint of the Catholic and Orthodox Churches, celebrated on 27 April. He was the son of the French-born Hubert of Liège, also a saint, and succeeded on his death in 727.

References

External links

8th-century Frankish saints
Bishops of Liège
746 deaths
Year of birth unknown